Cuthbert James Hunt Bradbeer (1880 – 18 August 1937) was an English professional golfer who played in the early 20th century. His best finish in a major championship was a tie for seventh in the 1913 Open Championship held on 23–24 June at Royal Liverpool Golf Club in Hoylake, England. He made his own gutta-percha golf balls and was also a club maker. Bradbeer was a frequent competitor in the Open Championship—having made at least 15 starts—and made his final appearance in 1935 at age 54.

Early life

Bradbeer was born in Berrow, Somerset, England, in 1880, the second child of George Bradbeer and Helena (née Hunt). He was one of nine brothers, most of whom became golf professionals. At the 1928 Open Championship James and his three youngest brothers, Bob (1894–1938), Ernest (1899–1969) and Fred (1904–1988), all qualified. Of the four only Bob made the cut, finishing tied for 23rd place.

As a young man he learned how to make his own gutta-percha golf balls and also apprenticed as a club maker. One of his golf ball designs from circa 1904 was a bramble-patterned golf ball he called "The Finch".

Bradbeer was a professional at Finchley Golf Club in north London from about 1901. He played in the first Tooting Bec Cup in October 1901, a tournament organised by the London and Counties Professional Golfers' Association, the forerunner of the Professional Golfers' Association which was founded later the same year. In about 1905 he became the professional at Porters Park Golf Club in Radlett, England, where he stayed for over 30 years.

During World War I, Bradbeer served in the Sportsmen's Battalion, part of what were called the Pals Battalions which were specially constituted battalions of the British Army composed of men who had enlisted together in local recruiting drives, with the promise that they would be able to serve alongside their friends, neighbors and colleagues ("pals"), rather than being arbitrarily allocated to battalions. Bradbeer was able to serve his country alongside several of his golfing acquaintances who also joined the battalion.

Golf career

Sphere and Tatler Foursomes Tournament
In 1911, Bradbeer was paired with Sandy Herd and together they won the 1911 Sphere and Tatler Foursomes Tournament from Walter Hambleton and J.H. Taylor by the convincing score of 8 and 7. Bradbeer had been runner-up in the Southern Professional Foursomes Tournament in 1909 and 1910.

1913 Open Championship
Bradbeer finished tied for seventh place in the 1913 Open Championship.

Details of play
The 1913 Open Championship was held 23–24 June at Royal Liverpool Golf Club in Hoylake, England. J.H. Taylor won the Championship for the fifth time, eight strokes ahead of runner-up Ted Ray.

Qualifying took place on 19, 20 and 21 June. The top 20 and ties qualified on each of the three days. Ray led after the first day on 147, with Taylor on 148, Irishman Michael Moran on 150 and Thomas Renouf on 153. Gale force winds on the second day led to some high scoring. Bradbeer, however, was able to cope with the heavy winds and posted consistent rounds of 78-79-81-79=317. He tied for seventh place with three other competitors.  Each of the seventh place finishers won £2 10s.

Ryder Cup
Bradbeer was one of the PGA selection committee's choices to play in the 1935 and 1937 Ryder Cup matches.

Death
Bradbeer died on 18 August 1937 in the War Memorial Hospital, Burnham-on-Sea, Somerset, England. Bradbeer had travelled from his home in Radlett, Hertfordshire to Burnham for a holiday. On arrival he called a doctor and went into hospital for a major operation. He was still playing at  a high level. In April that year he had won a local PGA event, the Porters Park Bowl, playing off a handicap of +2.

Tournament wins (3)
1911 Sphere and Tatler Foursomes Tournament (with Sandy Herd)
1926 Hertfordshire Open Championship
1937 Porters Park Bowl

Results in major championships

Note: Bradbeer only played in The Open Championship.

CUT = missed the half-way cut
"T" indicates a tie for a place

Team appearances
Seniors vs Juniors (representing the Seniors): 1928 (winners)

References

English male golfers
British Army personnel of World War I
Royal Fusiliers soldiers
People from Sedgemoor (district)
People from Radlett
1880 births
1937 deaths